Parachaetolopha is a genus of moths in the family Geometridae. Most species were previously included in the genus Chaetolopha.

Species
 Parachaetolopha anomala (Prout, 1941)
 Parachaetolopha coerulescens (Warren, 1906)
 Parachaetolopha collatisaeta Schmidt, 2002
 Parachaetolopha ferruginoapex Schmidt, 2002
 Parachaetolopha flavicorpus (Warren, 1906)
 Parachaetolopha nepenthes (Prout, 1941)
 Parachaetolopha ornatipennis (Warren, 1906)
 Parachaetolopha peregrina (Prout, 1929)
 Parachaetolopha petasitruncula Schmidt, 2002
 Parachaetolopha spinosicornuta Schmidt, 2002
 Parachaetolopha tafa (Prout, 1941)
 Parachaetolopha turbinata (Prout, 1941)

References

Larentiinae